The Most Popular Girls in School (abbreviated MPGIS) is an American adult stop-motion animated comedy web series that debuted on YouTube on May 1, 2012. Created by Mark Cope and Carlo Moss, the series animates Barbie, Ken and other fashion dolls, usually with customized costumes and hairstyles, as various characters. MPGIS follows the exploits of a fictional high school cheer leading team in Overland Park, Kansas and their friends, family and enemies. Variety described the series as "Mean Girls meets South Park". The first episode has been viewed over ten million times, and many episodes have received views in the millions.

In April 2013, MPGIS parodied the viral email rant of Delta Gamma sorority member Rebecca Martinson by having the character Brittnay Matthews (voiced by Lily Vonnegut) reenact the so-called "Deranged Sorority Girl Email". The MPGIS video went viral itself. On May 1, 2018, Extra Credit Studios announced a sixth season to be in development, as well as a Patreon to crowdfund MPGIS in addition to new spin-off shows The Most Popular Girls in Quarantine, Keeping Up With The Van Burens, and Models.

Storyline
Domineering Head Cheerleader, Mackenzie Zales, and her absent-minded, fellow cheerleader, Trisha Cappelletti confront new Overland Park High School student Deandra when she attempts to use their restricted restroom. They broker an alliance just as Shay van Buren - the most popular girl in school outside of the cheer squad - and her sisters drag the cheerleaders into a bitter feud, hoping to finally crush Mackenzie's cheerleading reign.

Outside of this drama, Brittnay Matthews, another Overland Park cheerleader, breaks up with her dimwitted, second-string, quarterback boyfriend, Blaine, who immediately begins dating her nemesis, the annoyingly French exchange student, Saison Marguerite. Brittnay is further infuriated by the Cheer Squad/Van Buren feud and the acceptance of new girl, Deandra, into the confidence of the squad.

Meanwhile, lonely lurker, Jonathan Getslinhaumer, tries to get the attention of the football team with his strange slang and empty threats, which mostly leaves them repulsed by his subconscious sexual innuendos. Finally, the unpopular and unattractive Rachel Tice, a childhood friend of Brittnay and Mackenzie who has since fallen out of favor, plots with her friend Judith to try to improve their social status. Rachel's moody sister, Bridget, occasionally makes an appearance to offer disdainful ridicule, and Lunch Lady Belinda cannot quite hide her crush on the dazzling Overland Park alumna Cameron Van Buren.

Later plot lines include the rivalry with cheerleaders from Atchison High School, a sabotaged prom, and a carefully planned revenge plot against Mackenzie.

The first four seasons take place in the girls' junior year at Overland Park High School, while the fifth season takes place during the summer between their junior and senior years of high school, with France being the primary location. Due to the COVID-19 pandemic, The Most Popular Girls in Quarantine is taking place over video calls while Overland Park is closed and Mackenzie attempts to get the school re-opened.

Cast

Main

Recurring

Episodes

Production and broadcast
The Most Popular Girls in School animates Barbie, Ken and related Mattel fashion dolls, generic fashion dolls and various branded dolls, usually with customized costumes and hairstyles, as various characters. Other dolls used include Disney's, Ariel, Belle, Merida and Mother Gothel, Finnick Odair from The Hunger Games, Tyr Anasazi from Andromeda, and Oscar and Evanora from Oz the Great and Powerful. Guest voice talent has included Grace Helbig, Jason Earles, Lee Newton, Tyler Oakley, Michelle Visage, Kingsley, EpicLLOYD, Hannah Hart, and Mamrie Hart.

A March 2013 Kickstarter crowdfunding campaign funded season 2 of the series, a November 2013 Indiegogo campaign funded season 3, and a November 2014 Indiegogo campaign funded season 4.

MPGIS premiered on YouTube on May 1, 2012. The fourth season concluded on May 31, 2015, and a fifth season was not announced until April 4, 2017. A sixth season was announced at the end of the fifth-season finale episode on August 29, 2017.

, the series' YouTube channel has over 1 million subscribers and over 170 million views. MPGIS has also produced spin-off shows The Trisha Show and Judy and Red, as well as bonus material like "Making of" and "Behind the Scenes" videos, viewer mail Q&A and "Extra Credit" (outtakes). On May 1, 2018, Extra Credit Studios opened a Patreon to crowdfund MPGIS in addition to new spin-off shows Keeping Up With The Van Burens and Models.

Reception
Variety described the series as "Mean Girls meets South Park in this trash-talking, boundary-busting high-school-set Web series, acted out by stop-motion Barbie dolls." The first episode has been viewed over 10 million times, and most episodes have received views in the millions.

In April 2013, MPGIS parodied the viral email rant of Delta Gamma sorority member Rebecca Martinson by having the character Brittnay Matthews (voiced by Lily Vonnegut) reenact Martinson's so-called "Deranged Sorority Girl Email". The MPGIS video went viral itself.

In January 2015, Variety reported that Charlize Theron's production company Denver and Delilah was developing a stop-motion animation series based on MPGIS with comic book writer Greg Rucka.

In August 2015, MPGIS was nominated for a Streamy Award for Costume Design.

Notes

References

External links
 
 

2012 web series debuts
American adult animated comedy television series
American adult animated web series
American comedy web series
Kansas in fiction
LGBT-related animated web series
2010s American adult animated television series
2010s American high school television series
2010s American LGBT-related comedy television series
American LGBT-related web series
American stop-motion adult animated television series
YouTube channels launched in 2012
YouTube original programming
Internet memes